Finegan is an Irish surname derived from the native Gaelic Ó Fionnagáin Septs that were located mostly in Counties Galway, Roscommon and Louth. Descendants bearing this name, and its variant Finnegan can still be mostly found in these three Counties. It

Notable people with the surname include:

Bernard Finegan (1837–1887), Irish Roman Catholic bishop
Bill Finegan (1917-2008), American jazz musician
Christopher Finegan (born 1971), English cricketer
Cole Finegan (born 1956), American businessman
George Finegan (born 1935), Australian rules footballer 
Jack Finegan (1908–2000), American biblical scholar
Joseph Finegan (1814-1885), Irish-born American businessman
Owen Finegan (born 1972), Australian rugby union player
Seán Finegan, Irish comedian

See also
Finnegan (disambiguation)

Surnames of Irish origin